Hangu may refer to:

Places

China
Hangu District, Tianjin, a district in Tianjin, China
Hangu Pass, a pass in China

Pakistan
Hangu, Pakistan, a town in Khyber Pakhtunkhwa Province
Hangu District, Pakistan, a district in Khyber Pakhtunkhwa Province
Miranzai Valley, also Hangu, in Khyber Pakhtunkhwa Province

Romania
Hangu, Neamț, a commune in Neamț County
Hangu (river), a tributary of the Bistrița in Neamț County

Others
Hanggu-guyok, a district in North Korea